Bardu Ali (September 23, 1906 – October 29, 1981) was an American jazz and R&B singer, guitarist, and promoter.

Biography
It has been reported that Ali was born September 23, 1910 or 1906, in Mississippi. His sister and older brothers born in New Orleans, Louisiana, to Ella Blackman, a new Orleans native, and Moksad Ali, an immigrant from Hooghly, in the Indian state of Bengal. There were several children born to this union. Two of the older sons moved to Galveston, Texas, but Ella moved to the Bronx, New York, with her other children and her sister Fanny. He got involved with black cinema in the late 1920s and 1930s.

He moved to New York City in the 1920s and became leader of the Napoleon Zyas band. He was master of ceremonies for this band and for the bands of Leroy Tibbs and Chick Webb. He is credited with persuading Webb to hire singer Ella Fitzgerald. He went on tour in England with Lew Leslie's Blackbirds revue. Returning to the US, he replaced Webb in 1935 as bandleader after Webb died. In 1940, he moved to California, where he became a business partner of Johnny Otis, performed as a singer in Otis's band, and opened The Barrelhouse club with him in 1947. He played an important role in the early career of Charles Brown and was Redd Foxx's business manager.

References

20th-century births
1981 deaths
20th-century American guitarists
20th-century African-American male singers
African-American guitarists
American jazz guitarists
American jazz singers
American male guitarists
American people of Bengali descent
American rhythm and blues guitarists
American rhythm and blues singers
American male jazz musicians